Gordon Neilson (born 28 May 1947) is a Scottish retired professional footballer who played in the Football League for Arsenal and Brentford as a right winger.

Playing career

Arsenal 
A right winger, Neilson joined First Division club Arsenal from amateur club Glasgow United in April 1964. He signed a professional contract in June 1964 and featured for the youth team which lost to Everton in the 1965 FA Youth Cup Final. He also played for the reserve and 'A' teams and had to wait until 12 March 1966 to make his first team debut, which came in a 1–0 league defeat to Everton. He made just one further appearance during the 1965–66 season, in a 1–0 victory over Leicester City on the final day.

Neilson had to wait until 19 November 1966 to make his next appearance, which came in a 1–0 victory over Fulham. He scored his first goal for the club in the following game, a 2–1 defeat to Nottingham Forest. He made a breakthrough into the first team and scored his second goal for the club in a 3–0 victory over Blackpool on 21 January 1967 and his third in the following game, a 3–0 FA Cup third round victory over Bristol Rovers. Neilson's run in the team came to an end in late February 1967 and failed to make any further appearances. He departed Highbury in October 1968, having made 17 appearances and scored three goals for the Gunners.

Brentford 
Neilson signed for Fourth Division club Brentford for a £10,000 fee in October 1968. In a time of financial uncertainty for the Griffin Park club, Neilson's £10,000 fee represented a major gamble. After making 29 appearances during the 1968–69 season, he made 39 appearances during the 1969–70 season and helped the Bees to a fifth-place finish. His appearances tailed away during the early 1970s and he made just 13 appearances during the 1971–72 season, in which Brentford secured promotion back to Third Division. Neilson was released after the season and made 104 appearances and scored 15 goals during his time with the Bees.

Hillingdon Borough 
Neilson ended his career with a spell at Southern League Premier Division club Hillingdon Borough during the 1972–73 season.

Personal life 
After his retirement from football, Neilson worked as a computer programmer later for the Bank of Tokyo-Mitsubishi in the City of London.

Honours 
Brentford

 Football League Fourth Division third-place promotion: 1971–72

Career statistics

References

1947 births
Footballers from Glasgow
Scottish footballers
Brentford F.C. players
English Football League players
Arsenal F.C. players
Hillingdon Borough F.C. players
Southern Football League players
Association football wingers
Living people